Songyuan Chaganhu Airport  is an airport serving the city of Songyuan in Northeast China's Jilin Province. The airport received approval from the central government in September 2014. The total investment is 1.15 billion yuan. It was opened on 29 October 2017 with an inaugural Air China flight to Beijing.

Facilities
The airport has a runway that is 2,500 meters long and 45 meters wide (class 4C), a 4,600 square-meter terminal building, and five aircraft parking aprons.  It is designed to handle 400,000 passengers and 2,000 tons of cargo annually by 2020.

Airlines and destinations

See also
List of airports in China
List of the busiest airports in China

References

Airports in Jilin
2017 establishments in China
Airports established in 2017